Talentvision 2 HD (Traditional Chinese/Simplified Chinese: 城市2高清台, Pinyin: chéngshì èr gāoqīng tái) was a Canadian Mandarin Chinese Category B specialty channel. It was owned by the Vancouver-based Fairchild Media Group (a subsidiary of the Fairchild Group) and Television Broadcasts Limited. The station broadcast exclusively in high definition.

On February 4, 2013, Fairchild Media Group received permission from the CRTC to launch Canadian Radio-television and Telecommunications Commission (CRTC) to launch Talentvision 2 HD.

Talentvision 2 HD sources its programming from Mainland China as well as Taiwan and 80% of the content will be different from the standard definition service Talentvision.

The channel launched on May 23, 2013, on Bell Fibe TV in high definition.  It was launched on Rogers Cable on July 4, 2013, and on Optik TV on October 8, 2013.  In June 2016, the channel was removed from Optik TV.  In July 2016, the channel was dropped by the remaining providers who carried it, Bell Fibe TV and Rogers Cable and subsequently shut down.

News
Talentvision 2 HD repeats the 7:30 PM newscast from Talentvision at 8:30 PM and 3:30 AM (PST).

References

See also
 Fairchild TV
 Talentvision

Chinese-language mass media in Canada
Chinese-language television
Companies based in Richmond, British Columbia
Multicultural and ethnic television in Canada
Television channels and stations established in 2013
Television channels and stations disestablished in 2016